Beginner's Luck is a 2001 British drama film directed by James Callis and Nick Cohen and starring Julie Delpy, Steven Berkoff, Christopher Cazenove, Fenella Fielding and Jean-Yves Berteloot.

Cast
 Julie Delpy - Anya
 Steven Berkoff - Bob
 Christopher Cazenove - Andrew Fontaine
 Fenella Fielding - Aunt Emily
 Jean-Yves Berteloot - Javaad
 James Callis - Mark
 Tom Redhill - Jason Keritos
 Rosanna Lowe - Hettie Burton

References

External links
 

2001 films
2001 drama films
2000s English-language films
British drama films
2000s British films